Kacheh Gonbad (also known as Gacheh Gonbad) is a village in Siyah Mansur Rural District, in the Central District of Bijar County, Kurdistan Province, Iran. In a 2006 census, its population was 449 people in 97 families. The village is populated by Kurds.

References 

Towns and villages in Bijar County
Kurdish settlements in Kurdistan Province